In geometry, the rhombicosahedron is a nonconvex uniform polyhedron, indexed as U56. It has 50 faces (30 squares and 20 hexagons), 120 edges and 60 vertices. Its vertex figure is an antiparallelogram.

Related polyhedra 

A rhombicosahedron shares its vertex arrangement with the uniform compounds of 10 or 20 triangular prisms. It additionally shares its edges with the rhombidodecadodecahedron (having the square faces in common) and the icosidodecadodecahedron (having the hexagonal faces in common).

Rhombicosacron

The rhombicosacron is a nonconvex isohedral polyhedron. It is the dual of the uniform rhombicosahedron, U56. It has 50 vertices, 120 edges, and 60 crossed-quadrilateral faces.

References

External links 
 
 
 Uniform polyhedra and duals

Uniform polyhedra